Dionisio Arce (14 June 1927 – 5 November 2000) was a Paraguayan footballer.

Arce played as a forward and was known for his ability to handle the ball and heading skills. He started playing for Paraguayan side Sportivo Luqueño before moving to Italy to play for several teams until the end of his career. He died in 2000, in the city of Bracciano.

References
 

1927 births
2000 deaths
Paraguayan footballers
Paraguayan expatriate footballers
Paraguayan expatriate sportspeople in Italy
Sportivo Luqueño players
S.S. Lazio players
S.S.C. Napoli players
U.C. Sampdoria players
Novara F.C. players
Torino F.C. players
Palermo F.C. players
S.P.A.L. players
Expatriate footballers in Italy
Serie A players
Association football forwards